Himal Karki is a Nepalese Politician and member of Provincial Assembly. Karki is also the deputy leader of the Nepali Congress party in the Provincial Assembly. He is currently serving as Minister for Physical Infrastructure Development of Province No. 1.

Electoral history

2017 Nepalese provincial elections

Reference 

Nepali Congress politicians from Koshi Province

Year of birth missing (living people)
Living people

Provincial cabinet ministers of Nepal
Members of the Provincial Assembly of Koshi Province